Nicola Lechner is an Austrian Paralympic alpine skier. She represented Austria in Paralympic Alpine skiing at the 1998 Paralympic Winter Games in Nagano, and 2002 Paralympic Winter Games in Salt Lake City. She won a total of five medals: three silver medals and two bronze medals.

Career 
At the 1998 Paralympic Winter Games, in Nagano, Japan, Lechner took the podium in four events. She won silver in the slalom (in a time of 2:06.22, gold for Sarah Billmeier in 2:04.99 and bronze for Maggie Behle in 2: 08.14), giant slalom (with 2:49.10 Lechner overtook Sarah Billmeier in 2:49.44, but finished behind compatriot Danja Haslacher in 2:47.70), and downhill (in 1:14.95, she finished behind Sarah Billmeier, 1st place in 1:14.79, but ahead of Maggie Behle, in 3rd place in 1:18.04). She won a bronze medal in the super-G LW2 race, in 1:09.06 (gold for Danja Haslacher with a time of 1:08.80, and silver for Sarah Billmeier in 1: 09.04)ː

At 2002 Paralympic Winter Games, in Salt Lake City, in 2:32.95, Lechner finished 3rd in the LW2 giant slalom, behind compatriot Danja Haslacher in 2:24.85 and American Allison Jones in 2:32.55. She finished fourth in Women's downhill LW2, and Women's super-G LW2. She did not finish in the Women's slalom LW2.

References 

Living people
Paralympic alpine skiers of Austria
Austrian female alpine skiers
Alpine skiers at the 1998 Winter Paralympics
Alpine skiers at the 2002 Winter Paralympics
Medalists at the 1998 Winter Paralympics
Medalists at the 2002 Winter Paralympics
Paralympic silver medalists for Austria
Paralympic bronze medalists for Austria
Year of birth missing (living people)